The 1975 Knockout Carnival was the 19th Australian National Football Carnival, an Australian football interstate competition. The tournament was won by Victoria.

The 1975 carnival represented a significant change in format for the carnival. Previous carnivals had all been played as a stand-alone event in a single host city, with each team playing the others in a round robin competition; but the 1975 carnival was played as a shortened knock-out tournament and split between two cities. Just three games were played: two semi finals and a final. The semi-finals were played as a double-header in Melbourne, and the final was contested a month later in Adelaide. Unlike previous carnivals, no All-Australian team or Tassie Medalist was chosen.

Squads

South Australia

Tasmania

Victoria

Western Australia

Results

References
1975 Knockout Carnival page on Full Points Footy

Australian rules interstate football
Knockout Carnival, 1975